Jungle 2 Jungle is a 1997 comedy film directed by John Pasquin, produced by Walt Disney Pictures and TF1 Films Productions, and starring Tim Allen, Martin Short, Lolita Davidovich, David Ogden Stiers, JoBeth Williams, and introducing Sam Huntington in his film debut as Mimi-Siku. It is an American remake of the 1994 French film Un indien dans la ville (also known as Little Indian, Big City). Its plot follows that of the original film fairly closely, with the biggest difference being the change in location from Paris to New York City.

Plot
Michael Cromwell is a self-absorbed commodities broker living in New York City. Wanting to marry his new fiancée, Charlotte, he needs to obtain a divorce from his first wife, Patricia, who left him some years earlier. She now lives with a semi-Westernized tribe in Canaima National Park, Venezuela. He travels there to get her signature on the divorce papers. Upon arriving, she reveals that they had a son together, who is now 13 years old and named Mimi-Siku.

Michael attempts to bond with Mimi in his brief stay with the tribe and promises to take him to New York City "when he is a man". He is also given a new name of "Baboon" as is a custom in the tribe. That night, Mimi undergoes the traditional rite of passage of the tribe, who then considers him to be a man. The tribal elder gives him a special task to bring fire from the Statue of Liberty in order to become the next chief. A reluctant Michael, realizing his promise would have to be honored sooner than he realized, brings Mimi to New York City with him.

Charlotte is less than pleased about Mimi and his primitive ways. As Michael attempts to adapt him to city life, cross-cultural misunderstandings occur when he reverts to customs considered acceptable by his tribe. On climbing the Statue of Liberty to reach the torch, he is disappointed when he sees that the flame is not real. After a brief argument with Michael, Mimi's antics have caused Charlotte to reach her breaking point.

While staying at the home of Michael's business partner Richard Kempster, Mimi falls in love with his daughter, Karen. He paints her face and gives her a new name, Ukume, as is the custom in his tribe. Richard resents Mimi's presence in his home due to his influence over Karen and because he cooked and ate his valuable prize-winning Poecilia latipinna fish. Richard freaks out when he sees Karen and Mimi together in a hammock and threatens to send her to an all-girls summer camp.

The Kempsters and Michael are targeted by Alexei Jovanovic, a Russian mobster and caviar dealer who believes that they have cheated him in a business deal. He arrives at the Kempsters' home and tortures Richard for information and is prepared to cut off his fingers. By fighting together, utilizing Mimi's hunting skills, and Mimi's pet tarantula Maitika, Michael and Mimi fight off Jovanovic and his minions.

Before returning to the Amazon jungle, Mimi is given a satellite phone by Michael so they can stay in touch. He also presents him with a Statue of Liberty cigarette lighter, which produces fire from the torch and will fulfill his quest. In return, he gives Michael a blowpipe and poisoned darts, telling him to practice and come to see him when he can hit flies.

Shortly afterward, Michael finds himself disheartened by the rat-race and realizes that his relationship with Charlotte is not working for him anymore. He attempts to kill a fly with his blowpipe on the trading floor of the New York Board of Trade. He hits it, but also his hot-tempered boss Langston who collapses asleep on the trading floor.

Michael returns to Lipo-Lipo to see Mimi and Patricia, bringing the Kempsters with him for a vacation. Karen and Mimi are reunited and it is suggested that Michael and Patricia also resume their relationship.

As the closing credits start rolling, Michael undergoes the rite of passage as Mimi did earlier.

Cast
 Tim Allen as Michael Cromwell
 Martin Short as Richard Kempster 
 Lolita Davidovich as Charlotte
 David Ogden Stiers as Alexei Jovanovic
 JoBeth Williams as Dr. Patricia Cromwell
 Sam Huntington as Mimi-Siku Cromwell
 Adam LeFevre as Morrison
 Valerie Mahaffey as Jan Kempster
 Leelee Sobieski as Karen Kempster
 Luis Ávalos as Abe
 Frankie J. Galasso as Andrew Kempster
 Carole Shelley as Fiona Glockman
 Bob Dishy as George Langston
 Dominic Keating as Ian
 Rondi Reed as Sarah

Production

Reception

Review aggregation website Rotten Tomatoes gives the film a rating of 19%, based on reviews from 42 critics. The site's consensus states: "Tim Allen spends Jungle 2 Jungle annoyed and put upon, mirroring audiences' reaction as they struggle through this witless family comedy."

Roger Ebert was disappointed by the film, giving it one star out of four, a small step from his original zero star rating for Little Indian, Big City. On his television program Siskel and Ebert, Ebert said Jungle 2 Jungle was not as bad as Little Indian, Big City because it was "far too mediocre to be terrible." He also described it as "lamebrained, boring, predictable, long, and slow", and added that while the French version was memorably bad, Jungle 2 Jungle was "just forgettable". Ebert's colleague Gene Siskel mildly disagreed, specifying that he felt Jungle 2 Jungle was just as bad as Little Indian, Big City. He also said he felt embarrassed for Allen and Short, as he felt they were used far better in other television programs and films. Siskel later went on to declare Jungle 2 Jungle the worst film of 1997.

At the 1997 Stinkers Bad Movie Awards, the film was listed as one of 30 dishonorable mentions for Worst Picture and was noted under the Founders Award, which lamented the year's biggest studio disgraces. Referencing Siskel's pick for worst film of the year (they called it "a horrendous embarrassment for Disney"), the Stinkers stated that it had "just as many laughs as Little Indian, Big City (zero) and we're being generous" and added that Disney needed to stop remaking so many films.

Soundtrack
The soundtrack consists of 14 songs with a total time of 50:20.

Track listing

 Maxi Priest - "It Starts in the Heart" (4:44)
 Peter Gabriel/Youssou N'Dour/Shaggy - "Shaking the Tree" (5:34)
 Dana Hutson - "It's My Life" (3:29)
 Jam Nation - "Awakening" (2:52)
 Joseph Arthur - "Big City Secret" (4:37)
 The Sha-Shees - "You Can Do It" (3:53)
 Rique Pantoja - "By the Sea" (3:48)
 Totó la Momposina y Sus Tambores - "La Sombra Negra" (3:25)
 "Between Two Worlds" (2:16)
 George Acogny - "Fire Dance/Ceremony Chant" (2:25)
 Eyuphuro - "Akatswela" (4:47)
 Afro Celt Sound System - "Whirl-Y-Reel I" (3:32)
 Totó la Momposina y Sus Tambores - "Malanga" (4:06)
 "New York Jungle" (0:49)

included clips 
Disney Time (1997) On BBC1 (Spider Chase From Jungle 2 Jungle)

References

External links

 
 
 
 
 

1997 films
1997 comedy films
1990s adventure comedy films
1990s children's adventure films
American children's comedy films
American adventure comedy films
American children's adventure films
American remakes of French films
1990s English-language films
Films about father–son relationships
Films about hunter-gatherers
Films about Native Americans
Films directed by John Pasquin
Films scored by Michael Convertino
French films set in New York City
Films set in Venezuela
Films shot in Venezuela
Wall Street films
Walt Disney Pictures films
1990s American films